Brandon Gilbeck (born December 9, 1996) is an American professional basketball player for the Formosa Taishin Dreamers of the ASEAN Basketball League and P. League+. He played college basketball for Western Illinois.

High school career
Gilbeck played basketball for River Valley High School in Spring Green, Wisconsin. As a senior, he averaged 17.4 points, 10.7 rebounds and 3.9 blocks per game. Gilbeck was named Wisconsin Division 5 All-State Honorable Mention and graduated as his school's all-time leader in blocks.

College career

Gilbeck played for Western Illinois for four years. As a sophomore, he set a single-season school record with 85 blocks and ranked fourth in the NCAA Division I with three blocks per game. In his junior season, Gilbeck was named Summit League Defensive Player of the Year and All-Summit League Honorable Mention. He became Western Illinois' all-time leader in blocks. Gilbeck averaged 10.8 points, 7.1 rebounds, and 2.6 blocks per game as a junior. On November 17, 2018, Gilbeck posted nine points and a career-high 19 rebounds in a 68–66 overtime loss to Eastern Illinois. On February 7, 2019, Gilbeck recorded 14 points, 16 rebounds and 10 blocks against Purdue Fort Wayne, the first triple-double in the Summit League since 2007. He averaged 3.42 blocks per game, which led NCAA Division I, repeated as Summit League Defensive Player of the Year and earned Second Team All-Summit League honors. Gilbeck also averaged 9.5 points and 8.5 rebounds per game as a senior.

Professional career
On August 8, 2019, Gilbeck signed his first professional contract with Horsens IC of the Danish Basketligaen. He averaged 9.4 points, 6.7 rebounds and a league-high 2.9 blocks per game before the season was cut short due to the COVID-19 pandemic. On July 30, 2020, Gilbeck signed with Latina Basket of the Italian Serie A2 Basket.

On June 2, 2021, Gilbeck signed with the Fraser Valley Bandits of the Canadian Elite Basketball League. He averaged 14.1 points, 7.7 rebounds, and a league-high 2.8 blocks per game. On August 18, he was named the league Defensive Player of the Year. Gilbeck signed with the Formosa Taishin Dreamers of the ASEAN Basketball League and P. League+ on September 8.

References

External links
Western Illinois Leathernecks bio

1996 births
Living people
American men's basketball players
American expatriate basketball people in Canada
American expatriate basketball people in Denmark
American expatriate basketball people in Italy
Basketball players from Wisconsin
Western Illinois Leathernecks men's basketball players
Horsens IC players
Fraser Valley Bandits players
People from Spring Green, Wisconsin
Centers (basketball)
American expatriate basketball people in Taiwan
Formosa Taishin Dreamers players
P. League+ imports